"Heaven Help You Now" is the eighth solo single from former Josef K vocalist Paul Haig.  It was released by Les Disques Du Crepuscule in September 1985.

The single was co-produced with former Associates instrumentalist Alan Rankine.

Track listing

 "Heaven Help You Now" (Extended)
 "World Raw"
 "Heaven Help You Now"
 "Chance"

References

1985 singles
Paul Haig songs
1982 songs
Songs written by Paul Haig